Phillip Bottams (born 24 August 1957) is  a former Australian rules footballer, who played with Richmond in the Victorian Football League (VFL).

References

External links 		
		
		
		
		
		
		
Living people		
1957 births		
		
Australian rules footballers from Victoria (Australia)		
Richmond Football Club players